Peter Nylander (born 20 January 1976) is a Swedish former professional ice hockey forward. He is the younger brother of Michael Nylander.

Nylander has played in his native Elitserien, the Finnish SM-liiga, the Russian league RSL and the KHL. He represented Amur Khabarovsk in Russia from the 2007–08 season until December 2009 and is now back in Sweden playing with Timrå IK for the remainder of 2009–10. In January 2012, he signed for Coventry Blaze of the UK Elite League.

Career statistics

References

External links

1976 births
Augusta Lynx players
Brynäs IF players
Expatriate ice hockey players in Russia
JYP Jyväskylä players
Amur Khabarovsk players
Living people
Mora IK players
SaiPa players
SKA Saint Petersburg players
Swedish ice hockey forwards
Timrå IK players
VIK Västerås HK players
Lørenskog IK players
Swedish expatriate sportspeople in Russia
Swedish expatriate ice hockey players in Finland
Swedish expatriate ice hockey players in the United States
Swedish expatriate ice hockey players in Norway
Swedish expatriate sportspeople in the Czech Republic
Expatriate ice hockey players in the Czech Republic
Swedish expatriate sportspeople in England
Expatriate ice hockey players in England